Michael Bazynski (born 12 October 1958) is a German judoka. He competed in the men's middleweight event at the 1988 Summer Olympics.

References

External links

 
 
 

1958 births
Living people
German male judoka
Olympic judoka of West Germany
Judoka at the 1988 Summer Olympics
Sportspeople from Bochum
Universiade bronze medalists for West Germany
Universiade medalists in judo
Medalists at the 1985 Summer Universiade
20th-century German people